The Ministry of Education is a ministry of the Government of Sri Lanka that directs the formulation and implementation of policies related to primary, secondary, and tertiary education in Sri Lanka.

Departments within the Ministry of Education
Department of Examinations
Educational Publications Department

Universities administrated
Advanced Technological Institute
Bhiksu University of Sri Lanka 
Buddhist and Pali University of Sri Lanka

List of ministers
List of Ministers of Education

See also
Education in Sri Lanka
List of schools in Sri Lanka

References

External links
Government of Sri Lanka
Ministry of Education Sri Lanka

Education
Education in Sri Lanka
Sri Lanka